A group of Cambrian metasediments  containing the Church Point formation and the intercalated High Head Formation.

References

Geologic formations of Canada